Rivadávio Alves Pereira (born 4 May 1944), known as Riva is a Brazilian former footballer.

References

1944 births
Living people
Brazilian footballers
Association football defenders
Fluminense FC players
Footballers at the 1964 Summer Olympics
Olympic footballers of Brazil
Pan American Games medalists in football
Pan American Games gold medalists for Brazil
Footballers at the 1963 Pan American Games
Medalists at the 1963 Pan American Games